Menlo Park was an alternative-rock band, founded in 1999, and recording between 2000 and 2003.

The band has been described by the London Evening Standard as "cajun folkists", by Time Out as "theatrical swamp", and by themselves as "hip-hop county" and "voodoo folk".

It featured Seb Rochford, who won the BBC Rising Star Jazz Award in 2004 and leads the Mercury Prize-nominated experimental-jazz group Polar Bear.

Band members
 Chris Taylor
 John Greswell
 Ben Nicholls (bass)
 Natasha Panas (piano, vocals)
 Seb Rochford (drums)

Albums and EPs

See also

 List of alternative rock artists

References

External links
 menloparkmusic.com, the band's official website
 Menlo Park on MySpace, including some press coverage
 

21st-century American musicians
Musical groups with year of establishment missing
American alternative rock groups
Musical groups disestablished in the 21st century
Musical groups established in 1999
20th-century American musicians
1999 establishments in the United States